James Hollowell  (1823 – 4 April 1876) was a British recipient of the Victoria Cross, the highest and most prestigious award for gallantry in the face of the enemy that can be awarded to British and Commonwealth forces.

Details
Hollowell was about 34 years old, and a private in the 78th Regiment of Foot (later The Seaforth Highlanders (Ross-shire Buffs, Duke of Albany's)), British Army during the Indian Mutiny when the following deed took place on 26 September 1857 at the Siege of Lucknow, India for which he was awarded the VC:

He later achieved the rank of lance-corporal. He joined the Corps of Commissionaires and is buried in an unmarked grave in their plot in Brookwood Cemetery.

The Medal

His Victoria Cross is displayed at the Regimental Museum of Queens Own Highlanders, Fort George, Inverness-shire, Scotland.

References

Location of grave and VC medal (Brookwood Cemetery)
The Brookwood Cemetery Society (Known Holders of the Victoria Cross Commemorated in Brookwood Cemetery)

1823 births
1876 deaths
People from Lambeth
Seaforth Highlanders soldiers
British recipients of the Victoria Cross
Indian Rebellion of 1857 recipients of the Victoria Cross
Burials at Brookwood Cemetery
British military personnel of the Anglo-Persian War
British Army recipients of the Victoria Cross